Thomas Bytton  was the Dean of Wells between 1284 and 1292.

References

Deans of Wells
13th-century English clergy